Ust-Kalmanka is a rural locality (a selo) and the administrative center of Ust-Kalmansky District of Altai Krai, Russia. Population:

References

Notes

Sources

Rural localities in Ust-Kalmansky District